Kick Off (stylized as KICK OFF) is the first studio album by the Japanese idol girl group Onyanko Club. It was released in Japan on September 21, 1985.

Track listing

Charts

Weekly charts

References 

Onyanko Club albums
1985 debut albums
Pony Canyon albums